The Samlaut Uprising, otherwise called the Samlaut Rebellion or Battambang Revolts, consists of two significant phases of revolts that first broke out near Samlaut in Battambang Province and subsequently spread into surrounding Provinces in Cambodia during 1967-1968. The revolutionary movement was largely made up by the dissident rural peasantry led by a group of discontented leftist intellectuals against Prince Norodom Sihanouk’s political organization –the Sangkum regime.

The rebellion first erupted in early 1967 in the Samlaut subdistrict when hundreds of frustrated peasants who were fed up with the government policies, treatment by local military, land displacement, and other poor socio-economic conditions, revolted against the government, first killing two soldiers on the morning of April 2. In the following weeks, the revolt quickly expanded with much more destruction of government property and personnel. By June 1967, 4,000 or more villagers fled their homes in Southern Battambang Province into the marquis (forest) to join the growing group of rebels and escape the military troops sent by Sihanouk. In the early 1968, Cambodia experienced a more organized and mature second uprising that expanded both geographically and politically through months of re-grouping, recruitment and propaganda processes, and was much more widespread and destructive than the first occurrence.

According to some academics such as Ben Kiernan and Donald Kirk, the Samlaut rebellion is seen as the initial beginnings of the Cambodian revolutionary movement (the Cambodian Civil War) that eventually led to victory of the Khmer Rouge and the establishment of the Democratic Kampuchea.

Kiernan says that the rebellion was the “baptism of fire for the small but steadily growing Cambodian revolutionary movement” while Kirk mentions that it was “a prelude, in a microcosm, of the conflict that would sweep across the country three years later.”

Causes, Background & Origins of the Rebellion

It is important to note that there have been differing constructed narratives of this rebellion due to the problematic political alignments involved in the Cambodian struggle. Firstly, the Republican government wanted to portray the Cambodian revolutionary movement as largely a foreign (mainly Vietnamese) transplant and preferred to gloss over the significance of indigenous leftist activity from 1967. Alternatively, F.U.N.K.(National United Front of Kampuchea) wanted to demonstrate unity between Sihanouk supporters and the Khmer Rouge, understating the extent of the development of the revolutionary opposition to Sihanouk before his overthrow.

In recent scholarship by prominent historians such as David Chandler and Milton Osborne, their general understanding of the rebellion was that it was primarily a localized action. According to Chandler, the revolt “sprang from local grievances against injustice and social change, corruption, and ham-fisted government behavior” and that the participants “did not respond to orders from the Communist Party of Kampuchea (CPK) central committee”.  Milton Osborne writes that the rebellion “was more an outbreak of largely spontaneous resistance to government actions than the first orchestrated challenge from the radicals”.

Apart from Sihanouk's strong-handed and corrupt Sangkum regime that fueled peasant grievances, there have been diverging strands contributing the origins of this rebellion. For instance, the rebellion was identified to have communist roots as it was the first part of Pol Pot's social and political two-phased strategy executed by the CPK. Furthermore, even Sihanouk himself was ignorant of this highly internalized and localized conflict, believing it result from foreign instigation.

A Localized Rebellion: Political Environment & Socio-Economic Conditions
With the escalation of the war in South Vietnam in 1965, the colonization of Battambang entered a new phase as thousands of Khmer Krom families began to cross the Vietnam-Cambodia border. The main government settlements were established in Kampot, Kirirom, Kompong Chhnang (Chriev) and Ratanakiri, with Battambang having the largest settlement. Sihanouk's generosity towards them increasingly became a source of grievance for the local inhabitants as they found themselves displaced from their land (many of whom did not even own their land) with unfavorable economic conditions.

Following the September 1966 election, the National Assembly was dominated by rightists with a minority of leftists, namely, Khieu Samphan, Hou Youn and Hu Nim, all of whom played highly influential roles in leading the revolts to come. As the newly elected Government asserted its control over Cambodia's provinces, it penetrated into the village level and was supported by the Prime Minister Lon Nol and the Royal Cambodian Army, boring down heavily on many peasants and pushing the Left towards the defensive. Furthermore, Sihanouk's wavering stance between the Right and Left appeared to be leaning towards the Rightists as he had imprisoned several Pracheachon party members and announced his non-endorsement for the September elections.

Sihanouk's supposedly neutralist policy had its roots in the independence struggle against French colonialism where Sihanouk forged alliances with several anti-French guerilla groups, both Leftists and Rightists. After independence, this neutrality, though maintained, started to diverge as Sihanouk allied himself principally with politicians on the right of the political spectrum. He did attempt to ally himself with certain members of the political left, such as Khieu Samphan. However, according to Etcheson, his relations with his domestic left were perfunctory and at most tactical. “The Prince encouraged his security forces to persecute the mass organizations of the Left, especially the main Leftist one, the Pracheachon, and its covert sister organizations in the countryside and the cities.”

Progressively, there appeared to be increasingly visible cracks within the political sphere as respective sides, strengthened and consolidated. As the Left gradually co-ordinated its activities, holding demonstrations in the towns, attacking the government and conducting propaganda efforts in the countryside, the predominantly right-winged government upped its military and economic regulations.
 
While Sihanouk was away in France, Lon Nol had considerable autonomy in effecting his economic policies. Often identified as the main driver of the rebellion, the rammassage du paddy was an efficient system imposed by Lon Nol in early 1967 whereby the government channels (mainly the military) took charge of buying and collecting the rice crops from the peasants. This was in response to the rise of a large rice export black market that greatly affected Cambodia's economy as it was heavily dependent on its taxation of rice exports. Here, farmers illegally sold much of Cambodia's rice to the Viet Cong (VC) across the borders as they paid more as compared the Cambodian government. Lon Nol was seriously concerned about the sale of large proportions of the rice crop to the VC or on the Saigon black market where clandestine sales were apparently handled by local Chinese middlemen who had found friends and worked in conjunction with cells of former Viet Minh sympathizers acting on behalf of the VC. This system provoked an uproar by the rural population in Battambang Province where it was first introduced as many households not only saw their earnings being severely reduced due to the low prices offered for the crops, but were also forcibly made to surrender their produce at gunpoint.

Furthermore, the strong intervention and presence of the army in Battambang involved the forming of co-operatives, forcing villagers to regroup while bearing the obligation of being a co-operative member in paying subscriptions to finance loans that fell into the hands of corrupt officials. In turn, they were given insecticides that were often mediocre quality or even false substitutes. Also, army officials were able to engage in illegal smuggling across the borders. Generally, activities of the army in Battambang prior to the revolt were heavy-handed and often brutal, alienating and enraging the inhabitants.

Another cause of growing peasant resentment and unrest would be attributed to the severe exploitation or confiscation of villagers by landowners. For instance, in Pailin Province, arable land was bought from the villages and converted into plantations for the expanding fruit industry, dominated by the Chinese and Burmese. The Khmer peasants either had to work for them as coolies or were displaced from their homeland. In other areas like Andoeuk Hep district, peasants faced harsh conditions due to the unsustainability and unproductivity of the cotton industry – due to high cost of labour and materials in intensive cotton cultivation, peasants cultivated large areas of land with low yields per hectare. The situation was further exacerbated by the increasing susceptibility to encroaching weeds and insects, greatly decreasing the yields. This caused large areas of land to lose their value, many peasants had to find other jobs while facing high indebtedness and landlessness.

Also, peasant discontent was contributed by the growing domination by the Chinese and other landowners, including Government officials. The continual buying and selling of land, due to failed crops, produced increasing impoverishment and a class conflict. Centered on rapidly growing fruit plantations, it was a conflict between a ‘rich and enterprising Chinese bourgeoisie which has taken possession of the land, and the alienated, indebted, and already semi-independent village communities.”

According to Kiernan, it was clear that “corruption, the misuse of military and other authority, and increasing impoverishment, in the Samlaut, Pailin and Andoeuk Hep districts, for example, created a vast reservoir of peasant unrest that lacked only a reasonably sophisticated leadership. By early 1967, that leadership had begun to take shape and it provided, as well as a sympathetic and purposeful ideology, the guidance to enable an already disaffected peasantry to carry out a serious and effective rebellion.”

Khmer Rouge Rebels
In the larger scheme of things, it is believed that external forces, namely Vietnamese and Chinese (to a smaller extent) communists played a role in planting the seeds of rural revolt. For instance, after 1945, the Vietnamese Communists were active in their Cambodian oriented efforts, sending cadres into the country to encourage, encadred and attempt to establish Communist hegemony over the movement for independence. In September 1960, the Communist Party of Kampuchea (CPK) was founded.

The rebellion was not simply a result of plotting by the radical left, though small pro-communist groups had been established in Battambang for years. CPK agitators like Khieu Samphan did play a part in fanning peasant discontent, but they were aided by widespread resentment at falling crop prices, bankruptcy, and the high-handed behavior of the military.

Some historians, such as Ben Kiernan, have stated that evidence points to the fact that the clandestine CPK was in fact planning an uprising across the country, citing the fact that the demonstrations rapidly spread to other, widely separated provinces. It is argued that some of the disturbances in 1967 were part of a coordinated effort by the leftists to destabilise Sihanouk's regime, though the official Khmer Rouge historiography given by Pol Pot later sought to deny this, stating its open rebellion only occurred in January 1968 and that the Samlaut incident was "premature" and surprised the communist party

“The people armed themselves with knives, axes, clubs and other weapons they could lay their hands on to attack police stations and military garrisons,” Pol Pot later explained. “[But] the Party Central Committee had not yet decided on general armed insurrection throughout the country."

The Rebellion

Ultimately, it was an amalgamation of elements that contributed to the 1967-68 peasant-led uprisings against the post-independence political developments.

1967 First Uprising
Armed resistance by the Left broke out in April, erupting in the Samlaut area in northwestern Battambang Province, a province long noted for the presence of large landowners and great disparities of wealth. On 2 April 1967, angry peasants attacked the soldiers who were collecting rice from the villagers, killing two of them and stole several rifles. In the afternoon, 200 rebels marched carrying banners denouncing the Lon Nol Government and U.S. imperialism, and attacked the J.S.R.K. (Royal Khmer Socialist Youth) agricultural settlement at Stung Kranhoung, the most obvious symbol of government presence in the area –the source of the villagers’ grievances and official mistreatment, as the target for their first organized display of force. By the evening of that day, they defeated guards from two other posts and executed a mayor. Over the next few weeks, the rural movement caused destruction to public infrastructure, agricultural settlements, seized weaponry and killed several army and village officials.
 
During this initial outbreak, Sihanouk was on one of his frequent sojourns in France, and Lon Nol, the prime minister, responded harshly. A platoon of paratroopers and the national police were sent into the region to protect the population, allegedly having been offered a bounty for each severed head of a rebel or leftist that they sent back to Phnom Penh. There, they discovered a rebel hide-out, their ration depots, stolen weaponry and captured 73 rebels. In the subsequent three weeks, nearly 200 rebels had been captured and 19 killed, however, rebel operations continued to spread geographically. On 22 April, Sihanouk charged five leftist deputies, including Khieu Samphan, Hou Yuon and Hu Nim with the responsibility for the rebellion, however, Khieu and Hou managed to disappear into the maquis. Hu Nim persisted in his attempts to maintain a public profile and to work alongside the government, but after repeated warnings from Sihanouk, he had also departed by the end of the year. On 5 May, workers from the Kompong Cham textile facotory, as well as its Director, and students from Kompong Cham University staged a demonstration with banners and loudspeakers, blaming the Government for the disappearance and suspected execution of Khieu and Hou.

Despite attempts at amnesty offered by Sihanouk to the local rebels, the rebellion continued to spread to the other districts towards the north and the east, with many of the villagers fleeing to the maquis to avoid the advancing army battalion. On the eastern side of the country, seventy armed followers of CPK cadre So Phim infiltrated the town of Kandol Chrum, killed a former district chief, and wounded a government agent; Ieng Thirith, another prominent Communist, was seen in Samlaut itself. In several areas across the country, suspected Communists were arrested, driven underground, or in some cases shot. With growing peasant unrest, Sihanouk was ready to sanction the brutal repression of leftist rebels, using the greatest possible force. Lon Nol had been implacable and retribution had ranged from summary execution to the burning of villages. Ghoulish details were provided of trucks filled with severed heads that were sent from Battambang to Phnom Penh so that Lon Nol would be assured that his programme was being followed.

At the end of April, Lon Nol resigned, though reasons behind his resignation were not clear (he was said to have suffered from some form of injury during the period of unrest).

In May and June, the military became even more brutal with Royal Cambodian Air Force aircraft bombing and strafing villages and jungle hide-outs, villages being burned to the ground or surrounded by the army and peasants massacred. In June, Sihanouk declared that the Samlaut Rebellion was at an end, by which more than 4000 residents had fled into the forests for over a month.

From October 1967 onwards, younger left-wing groups from the towns, including school teachers and ex-students, stepped up their liaisons with previously dormant cells of Communist sympathizers in remote areas like southern Battambang, while others joined the maquis. By the end of 1967, unrest was reported in eleven of the country's eighteen provinces. The Khmer Loeu regions of Mondulkiri Province and Ratanakiri Province fell almost entirely under CPK control by the end of the decade. In December, word had been passed around that the Samlaut rebellion was about to enter another phase.

1968 Second Uprising
Peasant support for the revolutionaries was compounded by persistent and increasingly oppressive processes such as the resumption of rammassage campaigns in late December 1967 and the government's decision to appoint village headmen and officials directly. Before 1968, headmen were elected by villagers, although the provincial authorities usually selected the candidates. As such, the central Government intervention represented a significant development in rural administrative repression by Phnom Penh, resented by many peasants who cherished the traditional autonomy of village affairs. Here, local corruption and increased administrative domination now threatened to add to other long-standing peasant grievances. Furthermore, in January, the American escalation of the Vietnam War was at its peak, instilling much paranoia and discontent amongst Kampuchea's outlawed dissident Left about Cambodia's potential sell-out to the Americans under Sihanouk based on visits from U.S. ambassador to India Chester Bowles and Marshal Tito.

The CPK's mid-1967 decision to organize a peasant army to wage all-out armed struggle against the Sihanouk regime could not be implemented immediately. By January 1968, the Battambang rebels were in touch with others in Kompong Chhnang and Kompot. More and more townspeople and intellectuals who were younger radicals left their jobs and fled to the forests, rate of disappearances from the towns, already high in late 1967 increased as rural revolt flared up in early 1968. A period of planning, preparation and communication between CPK cadres in various regions of Kampuchea (each of which had their own regional Party committee) supposedly continued until 17 January 1968, when the “real action” got underway as the first attack was launched by the Revolutionary Army of Kampuchea (RAK) on a military post at a place called Baydamram, in Battambang Province where several wooden bridges were burnt by the Khmer Rouge

This was followed by a series of clashes between troops and rebels, rebel ambushes on government military outposts, attacks on provincial guards, the stealing of rifles and weapons and the rounding up of families from villages who followed rebels into the forests –with a successful attack occurring on 25 January as rebels rounded up around 500 families from Thvak, Chisang, Beng Khtum and Samlaut. Rebels were active and widespread, with several rebel camp hide-outs set up in the forested areas throughout Battambang, carefully provisioned and fortified.

It soon became evident to Sihanouk and Lon Nol that the outbreaks in early 1968 had been well-prepared and more serious than the initial outbreak in Samlaut in April 1967, showing signs of matured leadership by men like Khieu Samphan, Hou You and Hu Nim. Furthermore, signs of unrest were also spotted in northeastern provinces like Ratanakiri as land was being taken by the government to set up rubber plantations. In late January, Sihanouk brought back Lon Nol in response to the rising unrest in Battambang as the Minister of Defence and Inspector-General of the Armed Forces.

Fighting continued to persist with increasing intensity from both sides until 25 February 1968, when the Khmer Rouge launched their most widespread and successful campaign yet. According to Sihanouk, ‘the blow of 25 February’ was an operation ordered and coordinated by the Khmer Rouge command consisting of a few intellectuals executing a concerted operation against isolated troops where the same movements and tactics were employed in Battambang, Pursat, Takeo, Kampot, Koh Kong, Kompong Chhnang and Kirirom, resulting in more than 10,000 villagers from all over taking to the forests to join the rebellion as a result of the years of propaganda work.

By March 1968, general conditions that prevailed almost everywhere made it suitable for the development of a mass-based revolutionary insurrection. This led to the replacement of provincial leaders with military officials and the harsh counter-forces of Lon Nol including the use of air force to bomb targeted rebel camps in the jungle. Not wanting to accede to the requests of the Khmer Rouge for a liberated zone (withdrawal of government troops from all villages and provinces where the Khmer Rouge are located) under the exclusive control and administration of the resistance, the rebellion continued to intensify throughout March. However, the situation started to turn bleak for the Khmer Rouge, suffering heavier losses against an increasingly consolidated and violent army who destroyed their camps and supplies, and a mobilized group of townspeople who supported Sihanouk and went against the peasants.

On 8 April, an important Khmer Rouge network consisting of two large fortified hide-outs and important installations including a rifle factory at Phnom Veay Chap were destroyed by the army. With the destruction of the Khmer Rouge base and growing number of casualties and captures, an increasing number of peasants began to surrender and return to their villages, concluding the series of 1968 revolts, at least for the time being.

Ultimately, all these measures served to increase the rural population's isolation from and resentment of the government, military and the urban elite, strengthening support for the revolutionaries as dissidence continued to persist in the following years.

Consequences, Implications & Significance of the rebellion down the road for Cambodia
Although most of the 10,000 or so peasants involved in the February 1968 exodus to the maquis returned to their villages by April and May, the Khmer Rouge still benefitted from a degree of popular support and protection. According to Charles Meyer, after 1967, the Khmer Rouge armed propanganda teams circulated in nearly all the villages in Kampuchea. Since the suppression of their forces, rebels in southern Battambang began to move south-east to link up with the Khmer Rouge in other provinces like Pursat, Kompong Chhnang and Kampong Speu. By mid-1968, they had established a network of bases, calls and lines of communication throughout Kampuchea.

The RAK obtained minimal assistance from the North Vietnamese, the VC and the Chinese. Although North Vietnam had established a special unit in 1966 to train the CPK, it was extremely reluctant to alienate Sihanouk at a time when vital supplies were passing through the port of Sihanoukville and along the Ho Chi Minh Trail to the VC bases along the Cambodia-Vietnam border. Beijing and Moscow also were providing Sihanouk with arms, many of which were being used against the insurgents. Perhaps, the indifference of the world communist movement to the Cambodian struggle since early 1967 made a permanent impression on Pol Pot and other Khmer Rouge leaders, shaping their isolated and self-sufficient vision of Democratic Kampuchea.

Sihanouk's policies, economically and politically oppressive Sangkum Regime, condoning of Lon Nol's brutal response to peasant unrest, and initial ignorance of the localized context of the rebellion had paved the way for Cambodia's increasing politicization of significant numbers of peasants, contributing to the growing Cambodian civil war and influenced the ideological groundings behind Democratic Kampuchea. Such growing dissidence from the beginnings of April 1967 was capitalized on and organized in the 1968 revolts, eventually leading to the growing establishment of the Khmer Rouge-led peasant rebellion that manifested in 1970. when Sihanouk's regime was overthrown by Lon Nol's  March 1970 Coup.

See also
Cambodian coup of 1970
Cambodian Civil War
Democratic Kampuchea

References

Bibliography
Blanadet, Raymond. 1’Institut de Geographie de la Faculte des Lettres de Bordeaux, In Les Cahiers d’Outre-Mer. Vol, 22-3, p. 353-78, 1970.
Chandler, David P. The Tragedy of Cambodian History. New Haven CT: Yale University Press, 1991.
Chindawongse, Suriya. “Pol Pot’s Strategy of Survival.” Fletcher Forum of World Affairs 15, no. 1 (1991): 128-145. url: http://dl.tufts.edu/catalog/tufts:UP149.001.00029.00012
Heder, Stephen. “Kampuchea’s Armed Struggle: The Origins of an Independent Revolution.” Bulletin of Concerned Asian Scholars 11, no.1 (1979): 2-23.
Hinton, Alexander Laban. Why did they kill?: Cambodia in the shadow of genocide. Vol. 11. Univ of California Press, 2004.
Jackson, Karl D., ed. Cambodia, 1975-1978: Rendezvous with death. Princeton University Press, 2014.
Kiernan, Ben. “The Samlaut Rebellion and its Aftermath, 1967-70: The Origins of Cambodia’s Liberation Movement. Part 1 & 2” Melbourne: Monash University Centre of Southeast Asian Studies Working Papers No.4 & 5, 1975
Kiernan, Ben, and, “The Samlaut rebellion, 1967-68.” In Peasants and Politics in Kampuchea, 1945-1981, edited by Ben Kiernan and Chanthou Boua, 166-193. London: Zed Press; New York: M.E.Sharpe Inc., 1982.
Kiernan, Ben. How Pol Pot came to power, Yale UP, p. 267-267, 2004
Martin, Marie Alexandrine. Cambodia: A shattered society. Univ of California Press, 1994.
Osborne, Milton E. “Farce turns to tragedy.” Sihanouk: prince of light, prince of darkness, 185-201. Australia: Allen & Unwin Pty Ltd, 1994.
Osborne, Milton E. Before Kampuchea: Preludes to Tragedy. Sydney: George Allen & Unwin, 1979
Rummel, Rudolph J. Death by government. Transaction Publishers, 1997.
Tyner, James A. The killing of Cambodia: Geography, genocide and the unmaking of space. Ashgate Publishing, Ltd., 2008.
Weltig, Matthew S. “From Political Work to Armed Struggle” In Pol Pot's Cambodia, 40-59. Twenty-First Century Books, 2008.

1967 in Cambodia
1968 in Cambodia
Conflicts in 1967
Conflicts in 1968